Earlsfield or Earlesfield may refer to the following places:
 Earlsfield, Queensland, a parish now in Jambin, Australia
 Earlsfield, London Borough of Wandsworth
 Earlsfield railway station
 Earlesfield, an area of Grantham, Lincolnshire, England
 Carrowcauly, also known as Earlsfield, a townland in Corran, Sligo, Ireland
 Earlsfield Estate, near Manorhamilton, Sligo, Ireland